Greatest Hits is an EP by Shockabilly, released in 1983 by Red Music.

Track listing

Personnel
Adapted from the Greatest Hits liner notes.

Shockabilly
 Eugene Chadbourne – vocals, electric guitar
 Kramer – organ, tape, production
 David Licht – percussion

Production and additional personnel
 Michael Macioce – cover art
 Scott Piering – recording (A1–A3, B1)

Release history

References 

1983 EPs
Shockabilly albums
Albums produced by Kramer (musician)